Salkot  is a village development committee in Surkhet District in the Bheri Zone of mid-western Nepal.

At the time of the 1991 Nepal census it had a population of 5027 people living in 868 individual households.

References

External links
UN map of the municipalities of Surkhet District

Populated places in Surkhet District